Mangrove Mountain is a suburb of the Central Coast region of New South Wales, Australia, located about  upstream and north of Spencer along Mangrove Creek.

Culture
The Central Coast Soaring Club is located near Mangrove Mountain. The club conducts glider-flying training and air experience flights over the Central Coast.

The area is home to a Greek Orthodox monastery, Pantanassa, and to Mangrove Mountain Union Church. Also within the region is an ashram. It is also home to Mangrove Mountain Memorial Golf Club, a 10-hole, 18 tee golf course, currently in development.

Climate

Notes

External links
 Monastery of Pantanassa (OrthodoxWiki)

Suburbs of the Central Coast (New South Wales)